The 2014–15 Siena Saints men's basketball team represented Siena College during the 2014–15 NCAA Division I men's basketball season. The Saints, led by second year head coach Jimmy Patsos, played their home games at the Times Union Center, with the exhibition game at Alumni Recreation Center, and were members of the Metro Atlantic Athletic Conference. They finished the season 11–20, 7–13 in MAAC play to finish in a tie for eighth place. They advanced to the quarterfinals of the MAAC tournament where they lost to Iona.

Roster

Schedule

|-
!colspan=12 style="background:#008000; color:#ffd700;"| Exhibition

|-
!colspan=12 style="background:#008000; color:#ffd700;"| Regular season

|-
!colspan=12 style="background:#008000; color:#ffd700;"| MAAC tournament

References

Siena Saints men's basketball seasons
Siena
Siena Saints men's basketball
Siena Saints men's basketball